Jacques Anthony Louis Beltrand (22 July 1874 – 2 December 1977) was a French engraver.

Works

Print
 1907 : Laboureur, bois en couleurs pour Vita Nova de Dante illustré par Maurice Denis (avec ses frères Camille et Georges Beltrand).
 1911 : Bois de L'Arbre tordu, Le Saule, Le Faune.
 1912 : Le Paysage aux lapins et Le Chercheur de champignons, deux bois en camaïeu.
 1913 : Cérès, bois en camaïeu.
 1918 : Vieil Arbre, bois.
 1919 : Les Petites Fleurs de Saint François d'Assise, 73 bois en couleurs d'après Maurice Denis (avec Camille et Georges Beltrand).
 1920 : Petit Paysage à Belle De ou Le Coup de vent, bois.
 1921 : La Divine Comédie, d'après les dessins de Botticelli. Trois volumes : L'Enfer, Le Purgatoire et Le Paradis, 1923.
 1925 : Carnet de voyage en Italie d'après Maurice Denis, bois (avec Camille et Georges Beltrand).
 1926 : Marine, fac-similé de lavis.
 1927 : Maîtres et amis de Paul Valéry, bois en camaïeu.
 1930 :
 La Mort à Venise, bois en couleurs d'après Maurice Denis ;
 La Douce Enfance de Thierry Seneuse, bois originaux ;
 Mer sauvage à Belle-Île et Gros Temps à Belle-Île, bois.
 1932 : plusieurs camaïeux de la forêt de Fontainebleau dont Le Paysage aux fougères.
 1933 :
 Les Thoniers à Belle-Île ;
 Crépuscule sur la mer d'André Suarès, bois d'après Maurice Denis.
 1935 : Port du palais à Belle-Île, fac-similé de dessin à la plume.
 1938 : Rochers de Belle-Île, bois.
 1949 : Rosalinde sur l'eau d'André Suarès, bois gravés d'après ses aquarelles originales.
 1950 : L'Isola Bella ou Belle De en Mer d'Anatole Le Braz, bois originaux.
 1950 : La petite fille de Jérusalem de Myriam Harry, douze bois gravés d'après les compositions de Roger Bezombes.
 1954 : Le Tombeau des poètes d'après André Dunoyer de Segonzac.
 1956 : Les Vacances forcées d'après Raoul Dufy, bois en couleurs.
 1958 : premier volume du Roman de Renart de Maurice Genevoix, bois d'après Paul Jouve.
 1959 : second volume du Roman de Renart, bois en couleurs.
 1962 : Le Sport de Jean Giraudoux, bois d'après les dessins d'André Dunoyer de Segonzac.

Publication
Quatre entretiens sur la gravure originale, avec Jean Émile Laboureur, Claude Roger-Marx et Luc-Albert Moreau, Paris, 1938

Expositions
 1911 : Turin
 1929 : Chicago, with the 
 1932 : Sweden, Exposition of livre d'art
 1935 : Milan, international fair
 1938 : Cairo
 1940 : Liège, Zagreb
 1941 : Paris, Palais Galliera

Awards
 1890, 1er prix de gravure et 2e prix de dessin de la Société de gravure Ier degré.
 1914 : chevalier de la Légion d'honneur.
 1926 : officier de la Légion d'honneur.
 1929 : médaillé au concours du musée Galliera (art religieux).
 1939 : prix d'honneur quinquennal de gravure.
 1957 : officier de l'ordre des Arts et des Lettres.

Functions
 1906 : membre de la Société des peintres-graveurs français.
 1913 : vice-président de la Société des amis des cathédrales.
 1922 :
 président de la Société de Beethoven ;
 assesseur à la Société de gravure sur bois originale ;
 membre du Comité des Tuileries.
 1926 : membre de la Société du Salon d'automne.
 1927 : président de la Société des amis des cathédrales.
 1930 : vice-président de la Société des peintres-graveurs français.
 1931 : vice-président de l'Association des prix du Salon et boursiers du voyage.
 1933 : président de la Société des peintres-graveurs français (jusqu'en 1946).
 1937 :
 vice-président (avec Jean Émile Laboureur) de la section arts et techniques consacrée à l'estampe à l'Exposition internationale de 1937 ;
 membre du Conseil supérieur des beaux-arts.
 1938 : président de l'Association des prix du Salon et boursiers du voyage.
 1940 : vice-président du Comité national de la gravure française.
 1941 : membre du Comité d'organisation professionnelle des arts graphiques et plastiques.

References 

1874 births
1977 deaths
19th-century French engravers
19th-century French male artists
Artists from Paris
French centenarians
Men centenarians
Officiers of the Légion d'honneur